The  Brazilian Anti-Corruption Act officially "Law No. 12,846" and commonly known as the Clean Company Act is a Brazilian law enacted in 2014 targeting 
 corrupt practices among business entities doing business in Brazil.  It defines civil and administrative penalties, as well as the possibility of reductions in penalties for cooperation with law enforcement under a written leniency agreement signed and agreed to between the business and the government.

The law is directed only at juridical persons which includes corporations and other institutions, but not individuals, who are covered by other laws.

The Act has been invoked numerous times, resulting in leniency agreements returning billions of reals to the Brazilian Treasury, notably the agreement with Odebrecht S.A., which by itself was responsible for twelve billion reals.

History 

The anti-corruption law is directed at juridical persons only. This includes corporations and other institutions, but not individuals. Under this law, corporations are administratively and civilly liable for acts of corruption. Criminal liability in Brazil due to acts of corruption applies only to individuals, so there is no possibility of criminal liability for a corporation. Corruption and other criminal acts by a company or other business organization can result in criminal sanctions only for its employees, partners or other natural persons who have committed the acts, and the public prosecutor may decide to charge them with criminal acts punishable by prison, but that is a separate juridical procedure targeting a "natural person" (a human).

This may reduce their fines by up to two thirds. Other advantages to self-disclosure and signing a leniency agreement include exemption from other provisions of the Clean Company Act which otherwise requires publication of the legal decision imposing the fines, a prohibition from receiving grants from public institutions, and restrictions on taking part in bids on public projects.

The law was amended in 2015 to make certain improvements based on experience up to that point. Provisional Measure 703/2015 made it easier for companies to apply for the benefits of a leniency agreement, and also changed the nature of the benefits. The previous cap for reduction in penalties was 2/3, and this law changed the cap to 100%. Formerly, only the first company to apply for leniency were permitted, and only before a lawsuit had commenced. These provisions were removed. The amendment also established a compliance, audit, and reporting requirement which was added to the law.

Leniency agreements 

Leniency agreements are defined under the Brazilian Anti-corruption Act in article 16. They target Brazilian companies and foreign ones with a presence in Brazil who are involved in corruption investigations. Under the law, companies are responsible for corruption and can face heavy penalties, a restriction on participation in future bids, confiscation of their assets, suspension of business activity, or dissolution.

Related agreements 

Brazilian companies have been involved in corruption investigations in countries outside Brazil, some in collaboration with Brazilian justice, and have paid fines in agreements reached in such procedures.  The most notable such case was the investigation of Brazilian construction corporation Odebrecht carried out by the United States and Switzerland with the cooperation of the Brazilian government.  As a result of the investigation into kickbacks paid to hundreds of politicians, including presidential candidates, as well as to judges on the Supreme Federal Court, Odebrecht agreed to pay a record fine of R$ 6 billion (R$ billion) in a leniency agreement. in a case described by attorney general Deltan Dallagnol as the "largest damages agreement in the history of the world".

Examples 

Some leniency agreements signed by July 2018 include:
 SBM Offshore  R$ 1.22 billion ($ million)
 Odebrecht  R$ 2.72 billion ($ million)
 MullenLowe and FCB Brasil R$ 53.1 million ($ million)
 Bilfinger R$ 9.8 million ($ million)
 UTC Engenharia R$ 574 million ($ million)

Compared with plea bargains 

Clean Company leniency agreements in Brazil apply exclusively to juridical persons, i.e., corporations or other business entities, but not individuals, and are not the same as plea bargain agreements which apply only to natural persons, i.e., people. Plea bargain agreements may be reached with executives or employees of those corporations to avoid personal fines or prison time. 

Individuals accused of involvement in corruption schemes may enter into plea bargains with the Public Prosecutor's Office (MPF) on their own.

They are covered by different laws. Some English sources which translate these terms observe the distinction, and others may be more lax, and confuse the two; they may use the term plea bargain (or plea deal) for both.

The first page of the affidavit between the United States Department of Justice and Odebrecht was filed in District Court in New York, and names it as a "plea agreement" (number 16-643), with the parties involved in the agreement named as "United States of America" and "Odebrecht, S.A., defendant", in which it specified a 25% reduction in penalties in exchange for the investigation assistance already provided and other remedies.

Related laws 

Other important anti-corruption laws passed in Brazil include laws such as Law No. 12.527 of 18 November 2011 (Freedom of Information Act), Law No. 12.813 of 16 May 2013 (Conflict of Interests Act), Law No. 12.850 of 2 August 2013 (Organized Crime Act), and Law No. 12.683 of 9 July 2012 (amended Money Laundering Act)

See also 

 Brazilian currency
 Constitution of Brazil
 Corruption in Brazil
 Crime in Brazil
 Economy of Brazil
 Federal Police of Brazil
 Industry in Brazil
 Judiciary of Brazil
 Law enforcement in Brazil
 Law of Brazil
 List of companies of Brazil
 Operation Car Wash

 Penal Code of Brazil
 Politics of Brazil
 Public Prosecutor's Office (Brazil)
 States of Brazil
 Timeline of Brazilian history

References 
Notes

Citations

External links 

 Constituição Da República Federativa Do Brasil De 1988 
 Constitution of the Federative Republic of Brazil  pdf; 432 pages
 Official Senate legislation search engine for Brazilian law 
 Unofficial translations of Brazilian law into English
 Anti-Corruption Act (full text) 

Anti-corruption measures
Society of Brazil
Government of Brazil
2014 in Brazil
Corruption in Brazil
Political corruption
Political history of Brazil
Politics of Brazil